The 1895 European Rowing Championships were rowing championships held on the Bruges–Ostend Canal in the Belgian city of Ostend on 15 September. The competition was for men only, and the regatta had four boat classes (M1x, M2+, M4+, M8+).

At the FISA Congress held on 14 and 15 September, five nations were represented.

Medal summary

Footnotes

References

European Rowing Championships
European Rowing Championships
Rowing
Rowing
European Rowing Championships
Sport in Ostend